Pipraich is a constituency of the Uttar Pradesh Legislative Assembly covering the city of Pipraich in the Gorakhpur district of Uttar Pradesh, India.

Pipraich is one of five assembly constituencies in the Gorakhpur Lok Sabha constituency. Since 2008, this assembly constituency is numbered 321 amongst 403 constituencies.

Members of Legislative Assembly

Election results

2022 

 
 

 

-->

2017
Bharatiya Janta Party candidate Mahendra Pal Singh won in last Assembly election of 2017 Uttar Pradesh Legislative Elections defeating Bahujan Samaj Party candidate Aftab Alam by a margin of 12,809 votes.

References

External links
 

Assembly constituencies of Uttar Pradesh
Politics of Gorakhpur district